Przewodowo may refer to these villages in Gmina Gzy, Pułtusk County, Masovian Voivodeship, Poland:
 Przewodowo-Majorat
 Nowe Przewodowo 
 Przewodowo-Parcele
 Przewodowo Poduchowne